Checkpoint Charlie (or "Checkpoint C") was the best-known Berlin Wall crossing point between East Berlin and West Berlin during the Cold War (1947–1991), as named by the Western Allies.

East German leader Walter Ulbricht agitated and maneuvered to get the Soviet Union's permission to construct the Berlin Wall in 1961 to stop emigration and defection westward through the Border system, preventing escape across the city sector border from East Berlin into West Berlin. Checkpoint Charlie became a symbol of the Cold War, representing the separation of East and West. Soviet and American tanks briefly faced each other at the location during the Berlin Crisis of 1961. On 26 June 1963, U.S. President John F. Kennedy visited Checkpoint Charlie and looked from a platform onto the Berlin Wall and into East Berlin.

After the dissolution of the Eastern Bloc and the reunification of Germany, the American guard house at Checkpoint Charlie became a tourist attraction. It is now located in the Allied Museum in the Dahlem neighborhood of Berlin.

Background

Emigration restrictions, the Inner German border and Berlin

By the early 1950s, the Soviet method of restricting emigration was emulated by most of the rest of the Eastern Bloc, including East Germany. However, in occupied Germany, until 1952, the lines between East Germany and the western occupied zones remained easily crossed in most places. Subsequently, the inner German border between the two German states was closed and a barbed-wire fence erected.

Even after closing of the inner German border officially in 1952, the city sector border in between East Berlin and West Berlin remained considerably more accessible than the rest of the border because it was administered by all four occupying powers. Accordingly, Berlin became the main route by which East Germans left for the West. Hence the Berlin sector border was essentially a "loophole" through which Eastern Bloc citizens could still escape.

The 3.5 million East Germans who had left by 1961 totaled approximately 20% of the entire East German population. The emigrants tended to be young and well educated. The loss was disproportionately great among professionals — engineers, technicians, physicians, teachers, lawyers and skilled workers.

Berlin Wall constructed

The brain drain of professionals had become so damaging to the political credibility and economic viability of East Germany that the resecuring of the Soviet imperial frontier was imperative. Between 1949 and 1961, over 2½ million East Germans fled to the West. The numbers increased during the three years before the Berlin Wall was erected, with 144,000 in 1959, 199,000 in 1960 and 207,000 in the first seven months of 1961 alone. The East German economy suffered accordingly.

On 13 August 1961, a barbed-wire barrier that would become the Berlin Wall separating East and West Berlin was erected by the East Germans. Two days later, police and army engineers began to construct a more permanent concrete wall. Along with the wall, the 830-mile (1336 km) zonal border became 3.5 miles (5.6 km) wide on its East German side in some parts of Germany with a tall steel-mesh fence running along a "death strip" bordered by mines, as well as channels of ploughed earth, to slow escapees and more easily reveal their footprints.

Checkpoint

It is in the Friedrichstadt neighborhood. Checkpoint Charlie was designated as the single crossing point (on foot or by car) for foreigners and members of the Allied forces. (Members of the Allied forces were not allowed to use the other sector crossing point designated for use by foreigners, the Friedrichstraße railway station).

The Soviets simply called it the  Crossing Point.

As the most visible Berlin Wall checkpoint, Checkpoint Charlie was featured in movies and books. A famous cafe and viewing place for Allied officials, armed forces and visitors alike,  ("Eagle Café"), was situated right on the checkpoint.

The development of the infrastructure around the checkpoint was largely asymmetrical, reflecting the contrary priorities of East German and Western border authorities. During its 28-year active life, the infrastructure on the Eastern side was expanded to include not only the wall, watchtower and zig-zag barriers, but a multi-lane shed where cars and their occupants were checked. However, the Allied authority never erected any permanent buildings. A wooden shed used as the guard house was replaced during the 1980s by a larger metal structure, now displayed at the Allied Museum in western Berlin. Their reasoning was that they did not consider the inner Berlin sector boundary an international border and did not treat it as such.

Related incidents

Stand-off between Soviet and U.S. tanks in October 1961

Soon after the construction of the Berlin Wall in August 1961, a stand-off occurred between US and Soviet tanks on either side of Checkpoint Charlie. It began on 22 October as a dispute over whether East German border guards were authorized to examine the travel documents of a US diplomat based in West Berlin named Allan Lightner heading to East Berlin to watch an opera show there, since according to the agreement between all four Allied powers occupying Germany, there was to be free movement for Allied forces in Berlin and that no German military forces from either West Germany or East Germany were to be based in the city, and moreover the Western Allies did not (initially) recognise the East German state and its right to remain in its self-declared capital of East Berlin. Instead, Allied forces only recognised the authority of the Soviets over East Berlin rather than their East German allies. By 27 October, ten Soviet and an equal number of American tanks stood 100 yards apart on either side of the checkpoint. This stand-off ended peacefully on 28 October following a US-Soviet understanding to withdraw tanks and reduce tensions. Discussions between US Attorney General Robert F. Kennedy and KGB spy Georgi Bolshakov played a vital role in realizing this tacit agreement.

Early escapes
The Berlin Wall was erected with great speed by the East German government in 1961, but there were initially many means of escape that had not been anticipated. For example, Checkpoint Charlie was initially blocked only by a gate, and a citizen of the GDR (East Germany) smashed a car through it to escape, so a strong pole was erected. Another escapee approached the barrier in a convertible, the windscreen removed prior to the event, and slipped under the barrier. This was repeated two weeks later, so the East Germans duly lowered the barrier and added uprights.

Death of Peter Fechter
On 17 August 1962, a teenaged East German, Peter Fechter, was shot in the pelvis by East German guards while trying to escape from East Berlin. His body lay tangled in a barbed wire fence as he bled to death in full view of the world's media. He could not be rescued from West Berlin because he was a few metres inside the Soviet sector. East German border guards were reluctant to approach him for fear of provoking Western soldiers, one of whom had shot an East German border guard just days earlier. More than an hour later, Fechter's body was removed by the East German guards. A spontaneous demonstration formed on the American side of the checkpoint, protesting against the action of the East and the inaction of the West.

A few days later, a crowd threw stones at Soviet buses driving towards the Soviet War Memorial, located in the Tiergarten in the British sector; the Soviets tried to escort the buses with armoured personnel carriers (APCs). Thereafter, the Soviets were only allowed to cross via the Sandkrug Bridge crossing (which was the nearest to Tiergarten) and were prohibited from bringing APCs. Western units were deployed in the middle of the night in early September with live armaments and vehicles, in order to enforce the ban.

Today: Tourist and memorial site

Although the wall was opened in November 1989 and the checkpoint booth removed on 22 June 1990, the checkpoint remained an official crossing for foreigners and diplomats until German reunification in October 1990.

Checkpoint Charlie has since become one of Berlin's primary tourist attractions, where some original remnants of the border crossing blend with reconstructed parts, memorial and tourist facilities.

The guard house on the American side was removed in 1990; it is now on display in the open-air museum of the Allied Museum in Berlin-Zehlendorf. A copy of the guard house and the sign that once marked the border crossing was reconstructed later on roughly the same site. It resembles the first guard house erected during 1961, behind a sandbag barrier toward the border. Over the years this was replaced several times by guard houses of different sizes and layouts (see photographs). The one removed in 1990 was considerably larger than the first one and did not have sandbags. Tourists used to be able to have their photographs taken for a fee with actors dressed as allied military police standing in front of the guard house but Berlin authorities banned the practice in November 2019 stating the actors had been exploiting tourists by demanding money for photos at the attraction.

The course of the former wall and border is now marked in the street with a line of cobblestones.  An open-air exhibition was opened during the summer of 2006. Gallery walls along Friedrichstraße and Zimmerstraße give information about escape attempts, how the checkpoint was expanded, and its significance during the Cold War, in particular the confrontation of Soviet and American tanks in 1961. Also, an overview of other important memorial sites and museums about the division of Germany and the wall is presented.

Developers demolished the East German checkpoint watchtower in 2000, to make way for offices and shops. The watchtower was the last surviving major original Checkpoint Charlie structure. The city tried to save the tower but failed, as it was not classified as a historic landmark. Yet, that development project was never realised. To this day, the area between Zimmerstraße and Mauerstraße/Schützenstraße (the East German side of the border crossing) remains vacant, providing space for a number of temporary tourist and memorial uses. New plans since 2017 for a hotel on the site stirred a professional and political debate about appropriate development of the area. After the final listing of the site as a protected heritage area in 2018, plans were changed towards a more heritage-friendly approach.

BlackBox Cold War Exhibition
The "BlackBox Cold War" exhibition has illuminated the division of Germany and Berlin since 2012. The free open-air exhibition offers original Berlin Wall segments and information about the historic site. However, the indoor exhibition (entrance fee required) illustrates Berlin's contemporary history with 16 media stations, a movie theatre and original objects and documents. It is run by the NGO Berliner Forum fuer Geschichte und Gegenwart e.V..

Checkpoint Charlie Museum

Near the location of the guard house is the Haus am Checkpoint Charlie. The "Mauermuseum - Museum Haus am Checkpoint Charlie" was opened on 14 June 1963 in the immediate vicinity of the Berlin Wall. It shows photographs and fragments related to the separation of Germany. The border fortifications and the "assistance of the protecting powers" are illustrated. In addition to photos and documentation of successful escape attempts, the exhibition also showcases escape devices including a hot-air balloon, escape cars, chair lifts, and a mini-submarine.

From October 2004 until July 2005, the Freedom Memorial, consisting of original wall segments and 1,067 commemorative crosses, stood on a leased site.

The museum is operated by the Arbeitsgemeinschaft 13. August e. V., a registered association founded by Dr. Rainer Hildebrandt. The director is Alexandra Hildebrandt, the founder's widow. The museum is housed in part in the "House at Checkpoint Charlie" building by architect Peter Eisenman.

With 850,000 visitors in 2007, the Checkpoint Charlie Museum is one of the most visited museums in Berlin and in Germany.

In popular culture
Checkpoint Charlie figures in numerous Cold War-era espionage and political novels and films. Some examples:

James Bond (played by Roger Moore) passed through Checkpoint Charlie in the film Octopussy (1983) from West to East.

Checkpoint Charlie is featured in the opening scene of the 1965 film The Spy Who Came in from the Cold (starring Richard Burton and Claire Bloom), based on the John le Carré novel of the same name.

In the feature film Bridge of Spies, imprisoned American student Frederic Pryor is released at Checkpoint Charlie as part of a deal to trade Pryor and U-2 pilot Francis Gary Powers for convicted Soviet spy Rudolf Abel. Pryor's release happens offscreen while the trade of Powers for Abel takes place at the Glienicke Bridge.

It was depicted in the opening scene of the film The Man from U.N.C.L.E (2015).

The 1985 film Gotcha! includes a scene where the protagonist (Anthony Edwards) transits through Checkpoint Charlie into West Berlin.

Elvis Costello mentions Checkpoint Charlie in his hit song "Oliver's Army".

References

Sources

Daum, Andreas, Kennedy in Berlin. New York: Cambridge University Press, 2008, .

External links

Museum Haus am Checkpoint Charlie

Berlin Wall
1990 disestablishments in West Germany
Berlin border crossings
Allied occupation of Germany
Checkpoints
Cold War sites in Germany
Buildings and structures in Mitte
Buildings and structures in Friedrichshain-Kreuzberg
1961 establishments in East Germany
Rebuilt buildings and structures in Berlin
Tourist attractions in Berlin
1990 disestablishments in East Germany
1961 establishments in West Germany